Oedudes alayoi is a species of beetle in the family Cerambycidae. It was described by Zayas in 1956. It is known from Cuba.

References

Hemilophini
Beetles described in 1956
Endemic fauna of Cuba